In Canada, the dean of the House is the sitting Member of the House of Commons with the longest unbroken record of service. The dean is responsible for presiding over the election of the Speaker of the House of Commons at the beginning of each Parliament. The position is the equivalent of the Father of the House in the British House of Commons.

Following a General election, or, the resignation or death of the sitting Speaker, the house meets to elect a new Speaker. This was started in 1986, however at the time, Speaker John Bosley presided. The first time the modern election system for speaker was used was in 1994.

During these elections, the Dean of the House takes the role of presiding officer. If the longest serving member is a Cabinet Minister, party Leader, House Leader or Whip, they are not able to act as presiding officer. In 1994, following the 1993 election, Len Hopkins filled this role as Herb Gray, the longest serving member, was in Cabinet. Although Gray was in cabinet, he was still referred to as Dean both in Hansard and by the press. Gray was also the longest-serving dean of the House, holding the role for 14 years from 1988-2002.

The current dean of the House is Bloc Québécois MP Louis Plamondon, who was first elected to the Commons as a member of the Progressive Conservative Party in 1984. The second-longest serving MP is currently Lawrence MacAulay, first elected in 1988. However, as a Cabinet Minister, MacAulay would not be able to service as Dean should Plamondon vacate his seat. Instead, MP Hedy Fry, first elected in 1993, would act in his place. 

The chart below refers to longest serving members, some of whom served in front-bench roles and, as such, did not preside over the election of the Speaker.

List of longest serving members

Notes

References

Political terminology in Canada
Senior legislators